Frankfort Commercial Historic District is a national historic district located at Frankfort, Clinton County, Indiana.  The district encompasses 57 contributing buildings and 6 contributing structures in the central business district of Frankfort. The district developed between about 1870 and 1947, and includes notable examples of Italianate, Romanesque Revival, and Classical Revival style architecture.  Located at the center of the district is the separately listed Clinton County Courthouse.  Other notable buildings include the Harker Building (1890), Frankfort Municipal Building (1916), Coca-Cola building (mid-1920s), Ross Building (1897), Keys Building (1899), and K. F. & W Traction Station (early 1920s).

It was added to the National Register of Historic Places in 1998.

References

Historic districts on the National Register of Historic Places in Indiana
Italianate architecture in Indiana
Romanesque Revival architecture in Indiana
Neoclassical architecture in Indiana
Historic districts in Clinton County, Indiana
National Register of Historic Places in Clinton County, Indiana